Live...Capitol Theatre 1978 is a three-CD live album by the American funk band Parliament-Funkadelic. The album was released in the UK in November 2017 by the RoxVox label. The CD features the band performing at the Capitol Theatre in Passaic, New Jersey, on November 6, 1978, during their "One Nation/Anti-Tour". The liner notes feature a transcription of a December 7, 1978 article about Parliament-Funkadelic from Jet magazine.

Track listing

Disc One

 James Wesley Jackson's opening monologue > Band intros
 "Uncle Jam"
 "Cosmic Slop"
 "Cholly (Funk Gettin' Ready to Roll)" > "I Got a Thing, You Got a Thing, Everybody's Got a Thing"
 "Give Up the Funk (Tear the Roof off the Sucker)" > "Night Of The Thumpasorus Peoples"

Disc Two

 "Red Hot Mama"
 "Into You"
 "Maggot Brain"
 "Let's Take It to the Stage"
 "One Nation Under a Groove"

Disc Three

 "Mothership Connection (Star Child)" > "Swing Down, Sweet Chariot"
 "Flash Light"
 "Standing on the Verge of Getting It On" > Drum solo > "Standing on the Verge of Getting It On" (reprise)
 "One Nation Under a Groove" (reprise)

Personnel

Bass: Cordell "Boogie" Mosson, Rodney "Skeet" Curtis
Guitars: Garry Shider, Michael Hampton
Drums: Tyrone Lampkin
Horns: Greg Boyer, Greg Thomas, Bennie Cowan
Keyboards: Bernie Worrell, Walter "Junie" Morrison
Vocals: George Clinton, Garry Shider, Ron Ford, Ray Davis, Dawn Silva, Lynn Mabry, James Wesley Jackson, Walter "Junie" Morrison, Jeanette Washington
 

George Clinton (funk musician) albums
2017 live albums